Elizabeth Grey, 5th Baroness Lisle, 3rd Viscountess Lisle (25 March 1505 – 1519) was an English noblewoman and heiress.

Life
Elizabeth was the daughter of John Grey, 2nd Viscount Lisle and Lady Muriel Howard. The death of her father in 1504 meant that she was born a considerable heiress and ward of the Crown. In 1509 her uncle, Thomas Howard, 2nd Duke of Norfolk, obtained a lease of her lands from the king. After the death of her stepfather Sir Thomas Knyvet in August 1512 and of her mother a few months later, Elizabeth's wardship was purchased by Sir Charles Brandon, a favourite of Henry VIII. Betrothal to his eight-year-old ward facilitated Brandon's elevation to the peerage as Viscount Lisle in May 1513.

In 1515, Brandon married Mary Tudor, the queen dowager of France and Henry VIII's younger sister (without having obtained the consent of the King). Having no need of Elizabeth as a potential bride himself, Brandon sold her wardship to Katherine Plantagenet, Countess of Devon for £4,000. The countess married Elizabeth to her son Henry Courtenay, a cousin of the King and grandson of Edward IV of England, but as she died aged fourteen it is unlikely the marriage was consummated. After her death the Lisle title passed to Arthur Plantagenet, the husband of Elizabeth's aunt.

References

1505 births
1519 deaths
16th-century English nobility
16th-century English women
English viscountesses
Elizabeth
Elizabeth
Elizabeth
Elizabeth
Barons Lisle (Peerage of England)